Argyrosticta is a genus of moths of the family Noctuidae. The genus was erected by Jacob Hübner in 1821.

Selected species
Argyrosticta amoenita (Stoll, [1780]) Panama, Suriname
Argyrosticta aurifundens (Walker, 1858) Mexico, Panama, Brazil (Rio de Janeiro, Rio Grand do Sul)
Argyrosticta bellinita (Guenée, 1852) Panama, Brazil (Pernambuco)
Argyrosticta decumana (Felder & Rogenhofer, 1874) Brazil (São Paulo, Paraña)
Argyrosticta ditissima (Walker, [1858]) Honduras, Trinidad, French Guiana, Brazil (Amazonas, Para, Parana), Colombia, Ecuador, Bolivia, Paraguay
Argyrosticta eubotes (H. Druce, 1903) Colombia, Brazil (Rio Grande do Sul)
Argyrosticta eurysaces (Schaus, 1914)
Argyrosticta meres (H. Druce, 1903) Colombia, Ecuador, British Guiana, Brazil (Parana)
Argyrosticta panamensis (H. Druce, 1889) Panama
Argyrosticta phraortes (H. Druce, 1903) Peru, Brazil (Rio Grande do Sul)
Argyrosticta scione (H. Druce, 1903) Colombia
Argyrosticta vauaurea (Hampson, 1908) Trinidad, Guyana
Argyrosticta venatrix (Stoll, [1782]) Suriname

References

Acronictinae